Karate at the 2001 Southeast Asian Games was held in UNITEN Bangi Hall, Selangor, Malaysia from 9 to 11 September 2001.

Medalist

Kata

Kumite

Men's Event

Women's Event

Medal table
Legend

References

External links
 

2001
2001 Southeast Asian Games events
2001 in karate